The Europe Zone was one of the three regional zones of the 1970 Davis Cup.

31 teams entered the Europe Zone, competing across 2 sub-zones. The winners of each sub-zone went on to compete in the Inter-Zonal Zone against the winners of the Americas Zone and Eastern Zone.

Spain defeated Yugoslavia in the Zone A final, and West Germany defeated the Soviet Union in the Zone B final, resulting in both Spain and West Germany progressing to the Inter-Zonal Zone.

South Africa were ejected from the tournament on 23 March due to protests over the South African government's apartheid policies.

Zone A

Draw

First round
Iran vs. Romania

Greece vs. Netherlands

Luxembourg vs. Ireland

Yugoslavia vs. Poland

Sweden vs. Spain

Turkey vs. Bulgaria

Switzerland vs. France

Great Britain vs. Austria

Quarterfinals
Romania vs. Greece

Ireland vs. Yugoslavia

Spain vs. Bulgaria

France vs. Austria

Semifinals
Yugoslavia vs. Romania

France vs. Spain

Final
Spain vs. Yugoslavia

Zone B

Draw

First round
Finland vs. Belgium

West Germany vs. Denmark

Egypt vs. Norway

Italy vs. Czechoslovakia

Portugal vs. Monaco

Hungary vs. Soviet Union

Quarterfinals
West Germany vs. Egypt

Monaco vs. Soviet Union

Semifinals
West Germany vs. Belgium

Soviet Union vs. Czechoslovakia

Final
West Germany vs. Soviet Union

Notes

References

External links
Davis Cup official website

Davis Cup Europe/Africa Zone
Europe Zone
Davis Cup
Davis Cup
Davis Cup
Davis Cup
Davis Cup
Davis Cup